Rapu-rapu Island is an island in the Philippines comprising the municipality of Rapu-rapu in the province of Albay. The island is situated in Lagonoy Gulf.

Islands of Albay